The 1930 LFF Lyga was the 9th season of the LFF Lyga football competition in Lithuania.  It was contested by 19 teams, and KSS Klaipėda won the championship.

Kaunas Group

Klaipėda Group

Šiauliai Group

Sūduva Group

Semifinal
LFLS Kaunas 9-1 Sveikata Kybartai
KSS Klaipėda 9-0 Makabi Šiauliai

Final
KSS Klaipėda 1-1 ; 3-1 LFLS Kaunas

References
RSSSF

LFF Lyga seasons
Lith
Lith
1